American Horror Story: Murder House is the first season of the FX horror anthology series American Horror Story. The season's theme is infidelity, and focuses on the plight of the Harmon family, Ben and Vivien, their daughter Violet and their dog Hallie, as they try to adjust to their new life in present-day Los Angeles, after Vivien has a miscarriage and Ben has an affair with one of his psychiatry students, Hayden McClaine. Violet, although originally upset about the move due to her being unable to make friends at her new school, begins to bond with the house, viewing it as a symbol of empowerment after she and her mother fought off home intruders. Violet also grows fond of one of her dad's therapy patients, who is being treated for psychosis, Tate Langdon. Ben and Vivien must endure the trials and tribulations of Ben's constant infidelity while Vivien is pregnant, prompting vengeful ex-mistress Hayden and overly maternal next-door neighbor and former resident of the house, Constance Langdon, to scheme to steal the children. The family soon learns that things are not how they seem when they begin encountering people whom they thought were dead in their house.

Cast members

Main cast 
 Connie Britton as Vivien Harmon
 Dylan McDermott as Dr. Ben Harmon
 Evan Peters as Tate Langdon
 Taissa Farmiga as Violet Harmon
 Denis O'Hare as Larry Harvey
 Jessica Lange as Constance Langdon

Supporting cast

Characters

Main characters

Vivien Harmon 
Vivien Harmon (portrayed by Connie Britton) is the wife of Ben Harmon, and the mother of Violet Harmon. Prior to the series' start, she had a miscarriage that caused her withdraw from Ben, who then had an affair with Hayden McClaine, one of his college students. Vivien initially finds it hard to forgive Ben, but Ben is committed to keeping the family together, and she agrees to move to Los Angeles to start over. She slowly warms up to her husband, and they have sex for the first time in months. She later participates in what she thinks is a kinky sexual encounter with Ben in a rubber bondage suit. Vivien soon discovers she is pregnant with twins, but later learns that due to heteropaternal superfecundation, only one of the babies is Ben's; with the other belonging to the man in the rubber suit (Tate Langdon). When Ben's now-pregnant ex-mistress, Hayden, shows up in Los Angeles to lure him away from Vivien, she is killed and she and the other ghosts plot to drive Vivien insane, in order to get her out of the house and raise her children. In "Birth", Ben and Vivien learn one of the twins is growing more rapidly, and may arrive at any time. Vivien gives birth to both twins – one of which is stillborn, the other healthy. In death, Vivien is able to forgive Ben and is able to raise her still-born son, and they and the other ghosts resolve to scare away any new tenants in order to prevent them from suffering the same fate.

Vivien returns in the eighth season, Apocalypse. She is unable to speak with Ben due to his connection with Michael Langdon until they apologize to each other. Vivien attempted to murder Michael after a group of Satanists arrived to the house to meet him, but she was saved by Tate after Michael attempted to destroy her, allowing him to leave the house.

For her performance in Murder House, Britton was nominated for the Primetime Emmy Award for Outstanding Lead Actress in a Miniseries or a Movie in 2012.

Dr. Ben Harmon 
Dr. Ben Harmon (portrayed by Dylan McDermott) is a psychiatrist, married to Vivien Harmon and the father of Violet Harmon. At the series start, Ben has an affair with one of his psychiatry students, Hayden McClaine, after his wife Vivien had a miscarriage. As a result, he and Vivien decide to move the family from Boston to Los Angeles to start over. Ben and Vivien's marriage becomes strained, due to her difficulty forgiving him for his infidelity. After a heated argument he and Vivien have sex. That night, a figure in a black latex suit (called the "Rubber Man") the Harmons discovered in the attic appears in the bedroom. Vivien believes it to be Ben, and has sex with him, unaware Ben is sleepwalking downstairs. Vivien learns that she is pregnant, and Hayden later reveals to Ben that she is pregnant as well. Ben returns to Boston to support Hayden through an abortion, but leaves while Hayden is in the operating room, after discovering multiple missed calls from Vivien. Hayden later shows up in Los Angeles and reveals to Ben that she has not received an abortion and plans on moving to Los Angeles so they can raise the baby together, but before she can do so she is killed by Larry Harvey, who attempts to extort Ben. Ben starts holding psychiatric sessions in his home office; one recurring patient, Tate, oversteps his boundaries when he starts dating Violet, and Ben discontinues their sessions. Vivien learns she is pregnant with twins, who both have different fathers – Ben and the Rubber Man, whom Ben learns raped Vivien. During a scuffle, Ben is able to pull off the Rubber Man's mask, and discovers that he is Tate Langdon before going unconscious. In "Afterbirth", after his wife and daughter die, Ben attempts to escape with his newborn son, but he is murdered by Hayden and the other malicious ghosts when they hang him from a light fixture. He is presumed by the living to have committed suicide. As a ghost in the house, he, Vivien, Violet, and more of the kinder ghosts take it upon themselves to scare away new tenants to prevent them from suffering the same fate.

He reappears in Apocalypse. After Michael discovered that Constance had killed herself to be free from him, he attended therapy sessions with Ben. A father-son relationship developed between the two, much to Vivien's dismay. Ben witnessed Michael mutilating the ghost of Elizabeth Short as well as not only murdering two new lesbian residents, but permanently expelling their spirits from existence. Ben, realizing Michael's capacity for evil, ended their sessions. He is no longer speaking to his wife Vivien (until she apologizes to him about Michael) and he frequently spends his time masturbating while crying.

Ben reappears in the seventh episode of the spin-off American Horror Stories as a character of Michelle's video game Escape from Murder House.

For his performance in Murder House, McDermott was nominated for the Saturn Award for Best Actor on Television.

Tate Langdon 
Tate Langdon (portrayed by Evan Peters as teenage Tate, Paul Butler as young Tate) is the son of Constance and Hugo Langdon and brother of Adelaide, Beauregard and Rose. He is a seemingly sociopathic teenage ghost who resides in the Murder House, and becomes romantically involved with Violet Harmon. He first appears in the pilot episode as one of Ben's new patients. During a session, Tate describes an ongoing dream in which he commits a mass shooting at his high school. It is revealed in "Halloween (Part 2)" that Tate was actually responsible for a school shooting that took the lives of fifteen of his classmates. During Halloween night (the only time ghosts are allowed to leave the property, and the first time he had left the house since his death) he and Violet are visited by the ghosts of his last five victims. It is revealed in "Piggy Piggy" that SWAT team members shot him 17 times in his bedroom for making a gun gesture with his hands and reaching for a gun under his blanket.  Constance implies that Tate's violent and unstable behavior is the result of the house's influence, but he is also shown using methamphetamine the morning of the shooting. As a ghost, he has murdered numerous people in the house, often while dressed in a latex fetish suit, revealing himself to be the Rubber Man. He also raped and impregnated Vivien Harmon. Tate claims to know nothing about the murders he committed, both before and after his death. However, it is revealed in the season finale that Tate has known all along or is simply in denial, unable to take responsibility for his actions (although this was later disproven). Upon finding out that Tate had raped her mother, and was therefore indirectly responsible for her death, Violet ends their relationship, leaving Tate devastated. Nevertheless, Tate tells Hayden that he is willing to "wait forever" for Violet to take him back. However more is revealed later on. The Murder House had actually been built over a portal to Hell itself, allowing Satan to use a form of possession and mind control on the living and spiritual occupants of the house, making them what Billie Dean Howard refers to as "Conduits", unwilling pawns completely unaware of the dark external forces influencing and controlling their actions. Satan specifically chose Tate as a vessel to control because of his painful and traumatic childhood. His mother was neglectful and verbally abusive to him and his siblings, causing Tate to seek out another mother figure in the form of Nora Montgomery's ghost, whose distorted memory patterns caused her to go from seemingly caring and nice to demanding, entitled, and even cruel. Tate's constant verbal and emotional abuse from his mother peaked in 1994, shortly before his shooting spree. After Constance had Tate's mentally and physically impaired brother Beauregard smothered to death by her boyfriend Larry, to prevent Child Protective Services from taking him since Constance had kept him chained in the attic for years, which itself was mentally and emotionally stressful for Tate. After Constance tried to pass off Beau's murder as a result of natural causes, Tate finally reached his limit and Satan was able to take control of his anger and frustration and amplified it with his malevolent influence and causing him to abuse drugs. Immediately before the shooting Tate had attempted to murder Larry, as revenge for killing his brother by setting him on fire, but only succeeds in disfiguring his appearance and giving him a permanent limp. After his death Tate began to dissociate due to his guilt and lack of understanding for killing innocent people, causing him to develop a split personality that would take over without Tate even realizing and commit atrocities as a Satanic conduit before switching back to his true kind-hearted self and repressing his memories, showing that Tate was actually an innocent victim that had no control of his actions. During Vivien's rape Tate's eyes turned pitch black, showing that Satan took full possession of Tate's corporal spiritual form to conceive his own child using Tate's DNA, when the child was actually his own. Tate's love for Violet is ultimately what allowed him to begin breaking free from Satan's control and begin to recover suppressed memories of his actions, causing him to feel great remorse for his actions and gave him a desire to do the right thing and protect Violet (although his alter-ego also does violent things to "protect" her in his own way). Violet leaving him finally let him break control completely, and Tate began to reform himself into a better person.

Tate returns in the eighth season, Apocalypse. Still frustrated and devastated about Violet, who continues to ignore him, Tate reunites with his mother, Constance, after she committed suicide by overdose, having apparently forgiven her, showing great personal growth. Later, Tate met Michael, his "son" conceived from Tate's enforced rape of Vivien Harmon, and rejected him, saying that he would never create something as "monstrous" as him. Sometime later, Michael realized that he made a mistake by coming to the Murder House. When Michael tried to banish Vivien's spirit from existence, Tate saved her. Sometime later, Tate overhears Violet and Madison Montgomery's conversation with Violet and apologizes for his previous actions. Violet accepts Tate's apology and they happily reunite. This is however reversed and erased later on in the season finale when Mallory uses the tempus infinitum spell to go back in time before all the events happened to kill a younger Michael Langdon to stop the apocalypse from happening.

Violet Harmon 
Violet Harmon (portrayed by Taissa Farmiga as teenage Violet, Carmen Blanchard as young Violet) is the teenage daughter of Ben and Vivien Harmon, who is initially unhappy about moving to Los Angeles. In the pilot episode, Violet befriends Tate Langdon, one of her father's patients, and the two eventually start dating. She later discovers that he is in fact a ghost who died in the house after committing a mass shooting at her school in 1994. Before making this discovery, she and Tate go on a date on Halloween night, only to be confronted by many of the ghosts of the students he murdered in the shooting. Days later, when speaking to Constance, and a medium Billie, she tells her Tate is dead -- and walking among the living. Overwhelmed with fear and shock, she attempts suicide by ingesting a bottle of pills, but she is seemingly saved by Tate. However, in "Smoldering Children", Tate reveals that her suicide attempt was successful and that she is now a ghost too. She lives in the murder house with her family. Neither she nor her parents are aware of this at first, because Tate hid her body in a crawl space under the house. When she tries to tell Ben that she's a ghost and therefore cannot leave the house, he refuses to listen to her and accuses her of being on drugs. In "Birth", Violet is informed by Chad Warwick, the ghost of a former resident, that Tate was the one who murdered him and his boyfriend, and that he also raped Vivien. As a result, she banishes Tate from contact with her by using the trick he taught her in "Open House". She is then comforted by Vivien, who died during childbirth. Violet apologizes for Vivien's death and the loss of the baby, and the two reconcile. In the season finale, Tate tries to murder a teenage boy who is currently living in the house in order to give Violet someone else to love, but she stops him and kisses Tate goodbye, allowing the boy to escape. At Christmas time, Violet is seen decorating a tree with her parents and Moira, as Tate watches from afar.

Violet returns in Apocalypse. She is approached by Madison, who tells her that Tate's actions in the past were the result of the Murder House, using him as a vessel to conceive Michael, and that he is truly a good person. Violet accepts Tate's apology, and they happily reunite.

Larry Harvey 
Larry Harvey (portrayed by Denis O'Hare), also known as the "Burned Man", is a former owner of the Murder House. He is heavily scarred, and walks with a limp. He originally claims, in the "Pilot" episode, that he acquired these injuries when he burned his wife and children alive, while under the house's influence, but it is revealed in a later episode, that his wife Lorraine set herself and their daughters, Margaret and Angie, on fire upon learning of Larry's affair with Constance. In the same episode, it is revealed that Tate actually set Larry on fire as revenge for killing his brother Beauregard. Larry later disposes of Travis' body after Hayden's ghost kills him and, in the "Smoldering Children" episode, implicates himself in the murder as an act of penance for what he had done to his wife and children. He is subsequently arrested and jailed for the murder. He is visited by Constance and tells her that he will be able to endure the punishment if she can just admit that she loves him, but she cruelly rebuffs him. As Larry doesn't appear in Apocalypse, he was mentioned by Ben in the episode "Return to Murder House". For his performance, O'Hare was nominated for the Primetime Emmy Award for Outstanding Supporting Actor in a Miniseries or a Movie.

Constance Langdon 
Constance Langdon (portrayed by Jessica Lange) is the next door neighbor of the Harmons, and a former resident of the house, who is determined to steal one of Vivien's twins and raise him as her own. Constance had four children: Tate, Adelaide, Beauregard, and Rose (the last of whom is unnamed and unseen until Apocalypse). She tells Vivien that her womb is "cursed" because three of her four children were born with a genetic defect, and Tate who wasn't born with a genetic defect was a psychopath and messed-up. Constance originally moved from Virginia to California in order to become a movie star, but she was against nudity so her career never took off. At some point in the late 1970s/early 1980s, Constance and her family moved into the house. In 1983, she caught her husband, Hugo, attempting to rape their maid, Moira, and shot them both. She buried Moira's body in the backyard and ground up Hugo with a meat grinder, feeding him to her dogs. At an unknown time, possibly due to financial hardship, Constance and her family moved out. The Harvey family moved in next, and Constance began taking advantage of Larry's affection in order to move back into the house. In 1994, Larry told his wife Lorraine of his intentions to divorce her and move the Langdon family in with him, causing Lorraine to kill herself and their children as a result. Not long after, Constance asked Larry to kill her son Beauregard, who was going to be taken away by child services due to Constance's neglectful and abusive method of chaining him in the attic. Larry smothered Beau with a pillow, and Beau's ghost still haunts the attic. Later that year, her son Tate went on a shooting spree, taking the lives of fifteen people, and was shot to death in his bedroom by a SWAT team. Constance's last living child, Adelaide, was hit by a car on Halloween night.  Constance pulled Addie's body to the house from the street before she died so she would be trapped by the house and continue to live on in spirit,  but was unsuccessful. Constance's much younger boyfriend, Travis, is murdered in the basement by the ghost of Hayden and resides in the house as well. In the season finale, after the Harmon family dies, Constance abducts her grandson and raises him in secrecy. Three years later, Constance claims to her hairdresser that after all the tragedy she's been through, the baby has given her the chance to be the mother of someone destined for "greatness". The last scene shows that her now 3-year-old grandson, Michael, has inherited his father Tate's psychopathy; he has brutally murdered his nanny, and is gleefully sitting in a rocking chair next to her corpse. Constance looks at him with pride, and says, "Now what am I going to do with you?".

She returns in the eighth season, Apocalypse. Following the events of "Afterbirth", Constance began noticing violent psychopathic tendencies in Michael, beginning with the killing of insects to eventually murdering his nanny at the age of three. One day, she entered Michael's bedroom to discover he had aged ten years overnight and now had the appearance of a teenager. When Constance was almost strangled to death by Michael in her sleep, she consulted the help of a Catholic priest, only for him to be murdered by Michael. With her dreams of motherhood shattered, Constance returned to the Murder House and committed suicide by overdose. She then became a spirit of the house and reunited with her children, Tate, Beau and an eyeless girl, Rose. She spends her time drinking, smoking and repeatedly forcing her maid Moira, with whom Constance has an intense grudge, to clean the house. When Madison and Behold Chablis visit the house, Constance tells them everything about Michael in exchange for removing Moira's spirit from the house. In the finale, after killing the priest, Constance forces Michael out of the home before he is run over multiple times by Mallory, thus preventing the apocalypse from occurring. Constance runs outside and Michael asks her to take him to the Murder House before he dies. Constance refuses and leaves him to die on the road, thus preventing her suicide.

For her performance in Murder House, Lange won the Primetime Emmy Award for Outstanding Supporting Actress in a Miniseries or a Movie, the Golden Globe Award for Best Supporting Actress – Series, Miniseries or Television Film, the Screen Actors Guild Award for Outstanding Performance by a Female Actor in a Drama Series and was nominated for the Saturn Award for Best Actress on Television and the Critics' Choice Television Award for Best Movie/Miniseries Actress, as well as receiving a 2011 Satellite Special Achievement Award. For her performance in Apocalypse,  Lange was nominated for a Primetime Emmy Award for Outstanding Guest Actress in a Drama Series.

Supporting characters 
 Moira O'Hara (portrayed by Frances Conroy as older Moira, Alexandra Breckenridge as younger Moira) was a maid for Constance and her husband when she was alive, and her ghost continues to service the current occupants of the house. Moira has been shown to appear as an old, matronly woman to women and a young, attractive woman to men. Constance caught her husband, Hugo, raping Moira and killed her by shooting her through the eye. Constance buried Moira's body in the house's backyard. Out of all the ghosts in the house, Moira is the only one that genuinely cares for Vivien's well-being, and she talks to her frequently to comfort her. Moira appears to display a mistrust towards men, frequently using her younger form to taunt them. In her younger form, she repeatedly flirts with Ben, and though he continually rebuffs her advances, he does fantasize about her on multiple occasions. Once Ben realizes that things in the house are not as they seem, Ben sees her in her "true" form. In the season finale, Moira assists the Harmon's ghosts in preventing any more tragedy by scaring away new tenants, and Vivien asks her to be the godmother of her newborn son. Moira makes an appearance in Apocalypse, and, due to Constance's orders, Madison and Behold exhumes Moira's remains from the backyard and buries them next to Moira's mother in the cemetery. Moira's spirit, released from her earthly hold, is greeted by the spirit of her mother, to whom she confesses euthanizing her on Halloween. Moira's mother thanks her for ending her suffering and the two pass peacefully into the afterlife. This is later changed when future Supreme witch Mallory travels to the past before all the events happened to kill a younger Michael Langdon to prevent the apocalypse. For her performance in Murder House, Conroy was nominated for the Primetime Emmy Award for Outstanding Supporting Actress in a Miniseries or a Movie and the Saturn Award for Best Supporting Actress on Television.
 Hayden McClaine (portrayed by Kate Mara) is the emotionally unstable, former lover and student of Ben Harmon. In the episode "Home Invasion", she calls Ben to request that he return to Boston to support her in getting an abortion, as she is pregnant with his baby. In the next episode, "Murder House", it is revealed that she had not gone through with the abortion. She informs Ben that she plans on moving to Los Angeles and expects Ben to divorce Vivien, pay for all of her expenses, and help her raise the child. Hayden is then murdered by Larry Harvey when he beats her to death with a shovel. She is buried in the backyard, alongside Moira's body, and Ben builds a gazebo on top of the grave. Since that episode, Hayden appears several times as a ghost to harass the Harmons, particularly in an attempt to drive Vivien crazy enough for her to be admitted for psychiatric treatment, and to stake her claim on one of the unborn babies. After the birth of the babies and Vivien's death, Ben is convinced by Vivien's ghost to leave the house with their only surviving child, before being met at the stairs by Hayden's ghost and the ghosts of the home invaders, Fiona and Dallas. The ghosts forcefully hang Ben from the chandelier, strangling him to death. Constance finds Ben's body, and immediately goes looking for her grandson. She finds him in the basement with Hayden's ghost cradling the living twin in her arms, intent on not allowing anyone to take him. Travis slices her throat (simply a momentary distraction, since both were already ghosts), takes the baby, and gives him to Constance. Later, Hayden tries to convince Tate's ghost that Violet will never acknowledge him again. He tells her that he is willing to "wait forever" for that to happen.
 Adelaide "Addie" Langdon (portrayed by Jamie Brewer as an adult, Katelyn Reed as a child) is the daughter of Constance and Hugo Langdon, and sister to Tate, Beauregard, and Rose. Addie would frequently appear inside of or near the house, often giving ominous warnings of death to those who enter, or to play with some of the ghosts that reside on the property. Constance appears to be somewhat abusive towards Addie, such as locking her in a closet full of mirrors if she misbehaves, but is very protective of her and appears to love her regardless. In the "Halloween" episode, Addie is killed in a hit and run accident. Her mother unsuccessfully tries to bring Addie's body onto the Harmon property so that her ghost will remain there. After her death, Constance communicates with Addie with the help of a medium, Billie Dean Howard, and Addie's spirit tells her that she forgives her for her abuse and that after finding out about Tate's psychopathy, she is glad she did not come back as a ghost, so she would not have to be near him. Addie is one of the few characters who dies on the show but does not come back as a ghost, other examples being Bianca Forest, Joe Escandarian, and Derek. Addie doesn't appear in Apocalypse, but she was mentioned in the sixth episode, "Return to Murder House". Addie makes an appearance in the seventh episode of the spin-off American Horror Stories as a character of the video game Escape from Murder House, where she shoots Dylan in the head.
 Marcy (portrayed by Christine Estabrook) is the Harmons' real estate agent. When the Harmons first view the house, Marcy gives them "full disclosure" of the house's history, but in fact only tells them about the previous tenants being found in the basement, in what was believed to be a murder-suicide. The house's history has caused its price to drop by half of its worth. The Harmons become the new owners. Once strange things happen to the Harmons, including a home invasion, Vivien forces Marcy to put the house back onto the market as the Harmons intend to move out. Several of the new prospects are heard from again; and one, Larry, comes across as creepy, causing Marcy to pull a handgun on him. When Vivien starts to think the house may be haunted, Marcy believes Vivien is delusional. After the Harmon family dies, she sells the house to a new family, again withholding the history of the house. Marcy adopts the Harmon family's dog, Hallie, after their deaths. Estabrook reprised this role in Hotel, where she is the realtor who sells the Hotel Cortez to Will Drake. While presenting the hotel to him, she revealed she had to euthanize Hallie. She is later killed in "Flicker" at the hotel, when Rudolph Valentino and Natacha Rambova enter in her room and drink her blood, she later return as a ghost in "Be Our Guest".
 Chad Warwick (portrayed by Zachary Quinto) was Patrick's partner, and the house's previous co-owner. Chad is shown to be a control-freak, which eventually drove away his boyfriend, Patrick, who regularly cheated on him. He bought the latex suit in order to accommodate what he believed were Patrick's sexual fantasies, but Patrick laughed at him and mocked him, devastating Chad and driving them further apart than ever. On Halloween, he was murdered, along with Patrick, by a man wearing the latex suit. The Rubber Man (Tate's ghost) began to drown Chad in a tub, but ultimately broke his neck. Both Chad and Patrick were brought into the basement, and their bodies were positioned for it to appear as a murder-suicide. It is later revealed that Tate's ghost had previously made a deal with the ghost of Nora, that he would provide her with a child; Tate murdered Chad and Patrick because it appeared their relationship would not last long enough for them to have children, and he hoped a new family would move in. After their deaths, Chad and Patrick appear to grow closer, intending to take one of Vivien's twins to raise themselves, but this comes to an end when Chad overhears Patrick telling Tate that he doesn't love him. For his performance, Quinto was nominated for the Saturn Award for Best Guest Starring Role on Television.
 Patrick (portrayed by Teddy Sears) was Chad's partner and the house's previous coowner. He was eventually turned off by Chad's controlling attitude and lack of "manliness", which caused him to cheat with other men. After walking in on the Rubber Man (Tate's ghost) killing Chad, Patrick was beaten and sodomized with a fire poker. After he died, Tate's ghost dragged Patrick and Chad into the basement and positioned their bodies to look like a murder-suicide. It is later revealed that Tate's ghost had previously made a deal with the ghost of Nora that he would provide her with a child; Tate murdered Chad and Patrick because it appeared their relationship would not last long enough for them to have children, and he hoped a new family would move in. In death, Patrick and Chad seem to be attempting to reconcile and intend to raise one of Vivien's twins, but this ends after Patrick confesses to Tate that, because of him, he is now doomed to spend eternity with someone he doesn't love.
 Leah (portrayed by Shelby Young) is Violet's friend. On Violet's first day of school, she is seen smoking inside the school's common area by Leah and her friends. Leah confronts the new student to the point of threatening Violet with physical force. Eventually, threats become reality and the two scuffle. Violet plots with Tate to lure Leah to the house's basement with the promise of a drug deal, which is a ruse to merely scare Leah enough to get her to leave Violet alone. The plan gets out of hand and Leah is attacked by the Infantata in the basement, causing deep facial scars and psychological trauma. The stress from scare also causes streaks of grey to later appear in her hair. The experience brings the two together as friends, leading Leah to give Violet pills to help her sleep.
 Lorraine Harvey (portrayed by Rebecca Wisocky) was the wife of Larry Harvey. In the pilot episode, it is stated that Lorraine and her two children were set on fire by her husband after he was influenced to do so by the Murder House. However, in "Open House", it is revealed that Lorraine immolated herself and their daughters, Margaret and Angie, after discovering Larry's love for Constance and his intention to file for divorce. In "Smoldering Children", Larry apologizes to Lorraine's ghost and swears to get revenge on Constance, but she tells him that he was the one who broke their vows, not Constance. In the season finale, Lorraine is seen trying to burn Miguel Ramos, desiring to inflict her pain on someone else.
 Dr. Charles Montgomery (portrayed by Matt Ross) was a surgeon to the stars in 1922 when he had the house built. He was a very successful doctor until he became addicted to ether and his reputation faltered. He soon developed a Frankenstein complex, and experimented using animal parts in the basement. Once the Montgomery's finances grew thin, he began performing illegal abortions in his basement on showgirl clients, provided by his wife Nora. After finding out about a secret abortion, an angry boyfriend of one of their clients sought revenge on the Montgomerys by kidnapping and murdering their infant child, Thaddeus. The baby had been dismembered and the remains preserved in jars. Devastated by grief, Dr. Montgomery reassembled their son using his remains, animal parts, and the heart of an abortion client. Upon seeing the monster Charles had resurrected, Nora killed her husband, before shooting herself in the head. Dr. Montgomery later appears to dismember the body of Elizabeth Short, who also died in the house, so she could be transported with more ease. He also mutilates Travis' body in the same way after his death. When Vivien goes into labor, Dr. Montgomery delivers the babies. Ross reprised this role in Hotel, in which he appears during 1926 terminating Elizabeth Johnson's pregnancy, only for the baby to survive and kill his nurse. He and his wife Nora are mentioned by Billie Dean in Apocalypse. He also appears in the eighth season via archive footage.
 Nora Montgomery (portrayed by Lily Rabe) was Dr. Montgomery's wife and Thaddeus Montgomery's mother. She was a society debutante before she moved to the new home that her husband built for her; the Tiffany glass fixtures were specifically chosen to match the color of her eyes. Nora was used to a wealthy and privileged lifestyle, and became verbally abusive towards her husband when their finances began to suffer. To supplement their dwindling income, caused by the lack of work due to his ether addiction, she and her husband provided illegal abortions in the basement of their home; Nora found the clients and anesthetized them, and Charles performed the procedures. After finding out his girlfriend had secretly gotten an abortion behind his back, an angry boyfriend of one of their clients sought revenge on the Montgomerys by kidnapping and murdering their infant child, Thaddeus. The baby had been dismembered and the remains preserved in jars. Dr. Montgomery had developed a Frankenstein complex and reassembled their son from his remains, animal parts, and the heart of an abortion-seeking client. The result was what is referred to as the "Infantata"; the creature was deformed and had razor sharp teeth and claws. Nora attempted to breastfeed the creature which resulted in her being bitten on the breast, as the monster desired blood and not milk. She then attempted to kill it with a letter opener, but failed. Upon realizing what her family had become, Nora shot her husband in the head, before turning the gun on herself. When she appears as a ghost, there is an exit wound in the back of her head from the bullet; this seems to cause some memory problems for her since she continuously cries for her son, and intermittently appears to be unaware of what has happened to him. Tate's ghost promises Nora's ghost that he will provide her with a child, under any circumstances. After Vivien gives birth to the twins, Nora takes one of them for herself. Soon after, however, she decides she no longer wants to raise a child and instead gives him back to Vivien. A picture of Nora, Charles and his son Thaddeus was featured in Hotel. She and her husband Charles are mentioned by Billie Dean in Apocalypse.
 Luke (portrayed by Morris Chestnut) is the Harmons' security patrol officer, whom the Harmons hire after the home invasion. Luke provides them with a button which, when pressed, alerts him to the house. Luke develops romantic feelings for Vivien, which she secretly returns. Ben picks up on the attraction and initially believes that Luke may be the father of the other one of Vivien's twins. Luke then reveals that he is infertile.
 Billie Dean Howard (portrayed by Sarah Paulson) is a medium. Constance introduces her to Violet in "Piggy Piggy", after Violet learns of Tate's dark past. After noticing Violet's confusion, Billie Dean tells Violet about how some confused spirits linger on the earth after their deaths. Constance explained that she had wanted Ben to treat Tate, hoping that he would accept his "condition", and she wants Violet to help Tate move on. Violet still doubts Billie Dean's validity as a medium, but Billie Dean then asks about a woman named Mary, presumably Violet's dead grandmother, whom Billie "sees" formerly telling Violet that people didn't "understand" her. Violet no longer doubts Billie Dean's integrity. Violet later understands that Tate is indeed dead and is a ghost. After her death, Billie Dean asks Constance to "talk" to Addie, which she does. When Constance learns that Tate's ghost had sex with Vivien, she asks Billie Dean what happens when a human copulates with a spirit and there is a conception. Billie Dean tells her about the Pope's Box, a locked box to which a new Pope is given a key. Inside is the ultimate secret of the end of the world, foretelling how the Antichrist, born of human and spirit, will usher in the End of Times. Paulson reprised this role in Hotel, in which she continuously investigates the Hotel Cortez until 2022 when the ghosts of John Lowe, James March, and his serial killer guests threaten her to cease her action and never mention the Cortez again, or she will be tracked down and murdered by Ramona Royale. She reappears in Apocalypse by visiting the Murder House and subdues Beau from Madison. She is likely one of the victims of the nuclear holocaust caused by Michael Langdon, her death is later reversed by Mallory, when timeline is altered. 
 Travis Wanderley (portrayed by Michael Graziadei) first appears as Constance's "business associate", as he is described by her to Addie when she interrupts them in the "Home Invasion" episode. He is a struggling actor, employed at a call center. He becomes close enough to Addie to read her stories and hear her secrets, which comes across to Constance as Addie trying to take him away from her. After Addie's death, his relationship with Constance becomes strained. They frequently argue, leading him to become intimate with Hayden's ghost. In the "Spooky Little Girl" episode, he is murdered by Hayden, and becomes one of the ghosts in the house. His body is mutilated by Charles Montgomery, in the same way that he mutilated Elizabeth Short's, and he is disposed of by Larry. When his body is discovered, Travis is referred to by the media as the "Boy Dahlia", in contrast to Elizabeth Short, who was referred to as the "Black Dahlia". When Travis learns of his media coverage, he is delighted that he has finally become famous. Travis' ghost assists Constance in the season one finale; when Hayden tries to prevent Constance from taking the living twin out of the house, Travis slices her throat and hands the baby to Constance.

Minor characters 
 Stephanie Boggs (portrayed by Alessandra Torresani) was a victim of the 1994 Westfield High shooting, and the first to die in the library. She was dressed in gothic clothing, and died after Tate shot her in the head.
 Kevin Gedman (Jordan David) was a victim of the 1994 Westfield High shooting, and the second to die in the library. Once the shooting began, he ran into the library and barricaded the door. He was wearing a black leather jacket, and is shown as a ghost covered in the blood of one of his classmates. He died while begging Tate for his life.
 Amir Stanley (Alexander Nimetz) was a victim of the 1994 Westfield High shooting, and the third to die in the library. He was editor of the yearbook. His ghost cannot speak because Tate shot Amir's jaw off when he tried to dial the phone for help.
 Kyle Greenwell (portrayed by Brando Eaton) was a victim of the 1994 Westfield High shooting, and the fourth to die in the library. Kyle wore a letterman's jacket, and was a football player who had recently earned a scholarship to Georgia Tech. He died after Tate shot him in the head.
 Chloe Stapleton (portrayed by Ashley Rickards) was the final victim of the 1994 Westfield High shooting. She was a varsity cheerleader, and was shot in the chest by Tate in the library.
 Bryan and Troy Rutger (Kai and Bodhi Schulz, Luke Sonderman and Jackson Unvert in American Horror Stories) were two destructive red-haired preadolescent twins who are shown to have been victims of the house in the "Pilot" episode. In 1978, they explored the then-abandoned house, before being killed by the Infantata. Their ghosts can be seen throughout the first season, usually causing trouble, breaking things and throwing bang snaps. Bryan and Troy returns in the spin-off American Horror Stories, where the twins lure Dr. Andi Grant to the basement and later to be killed by the Rubber Woman, later, they scare Maya and her friends in the basement.
 Elizabeth Short / The Black Dahlia (portrayed by Mena Suvari) was an aspiring actress who was given an accidental overdose of nitrous oxide by Dr. Curran, a dentist living in the house in 1947. Unable to pay for the procedure, Elizabeth offered to pay Dr. Curan with sex instead, but was killed after Dr. Curran accidentally left her on nitrous oxide while raping her, causing her to overdose. The ghost of Dr. Montgomery helped Dr. Curran dispose of the body by dismembering her, making her body easier to transport. Her body was found by a mother and toddler, displaying a Glasgow smile. Her ghost assisted the Harmons in scaring off the Ramos family in the season one finale. The Black Dahlia reappears in Apocalypse as being mutilated by Michael. Elizabeth Short's character is based on the real-life woman of the same name, who was found mutilated in the same manner displayed in the show.
 Dr. Curran (portrayed by Joshua Malina) was a dentist who lived in the house in 1947. He used the house for dental practice. When Elizabeth Short came for an appointment, he had sex with her unconscious body as payment for the procedure. When he unknowingly gave Elizabeth too much anaesthesia, she overdosed and died. Panicking, Dr. Curran dragged Elizabeth to the basement, where he was met by the ghost of Dr. Montgomery who promised he would take care of it. Dr. Montgomery mutilated her body, before giving it to Dr. Curran to dispose of.
 Maria (portrayed by Rosa Salazar) was a student nurse murdered in the house in 1968. She was tied up and stabbed in the back repeatedly by murderer R. Franklin. Her ghost assists the ghost of Dr. Montgomery in delivering Vivien's twins in the "Birth" episode.
 Gladys (Celia Finkelstein) was a student nurse murdered in the house in 1968. She was drowned in a bathtub by murderer R. Franklin. Her ghost has appeared several times from a filled bathtub, as well as assisting the ghost of Dr. Montgomery in delivering Vivien's twins in the "Birth" episode. Gladys reappears in Apocalypse wandering all over the house. Gladys reappears again in the spin-off American Horror Stories, where she is chased by Ruby McDaniel and later stabbed by Scarlett Winslow as the Rubber Woman.
 R. Franklin (Jamie Harris) is a serial killer who murdered Maria and Gladys in the house in 1968. He visits the house, pretending to be injured and needing help. He is let inside and knocks out Maria using an ashtray. He then forces Gladys upstairs and drowns her in a bathtub. He forces Maria to wear a nurse's uniform, and ties her up on the couch. He walks away, leading Maria to believe he is letting her go, before stabbing her in the back repeatedly.
 Bianca Forest (portrayed by Mageina Tovah) is a copycat killer who poses as a patient of Ben Harmon's. She tells him during a session that she regularly dreams of being cut in half while trying to escape from a falling elevator. She claims to have gotten lost in the house after the session. Later, she comes back to the house to re-enact R. Franklin's murders, along with Fiona and Dallas. She eats an ipecac-spiked cupcake which Constance had actually made for Violet out of spite after she began dating her son, Tate. Violently vomiting, Bianca is killed by Tate who hits her with an axe. She is found dead six blocks away from the house. Bianca, unlike Fiona and Dallas, doesn't come back as a ghost because she did not actually die on the property.
 Fiona (portrayed by Azura Skye) is one of the home invaders who tries to re-enact the R. Franklin murders as a copycat crime. Fiona uses the same ploy R. Franklin used to gain access to the house, by feigning injury. Vivien initially refuses to let her in, but she gains access herself. Fiona brings out an ashtray, which she claims is the same one R. Franklin used to knock out Maria. Fiona is obsessed with the recreation being absolutely accurate. Violet informs her that the original bathtub was moved downstairs in a remodel, which infuriates Fiona. Fiona then comes face-to-face with the ghosts of Tate and Gladys, and is found dripping wet (presumably drowned) with her throat slit. Fiona becomes a ghost and she and Dallas help Hayden murder Ben in the "Afterbirth" episode.
 Dallas (portrayed by Kyle Davis) is one of the home invaders who tries to re-enact the R. Franklin murders as a copycat crime. Dallas holds Vivien hostage, and when he unties Vivien to force her to wear the nurse's uniform, Vivien tries to distract him. She eventually grabs the ashtray the invaders had planned to use in the re-enactment and uses it to knock him out. Maria's ghost leads Dallas to the basement, where he is killed by her and Gladys. His throat is slit and there appears to be stab wounds. Dallas becomes a ghost and he, along with Fiona, helps Hayden murder Ben in the "Afterbirth" episode.
 Thaddeus Montgomery / The Infantata (Ben Woolf, Shane Carpenter in American Horror Stories) is the son of Dr. Charles and Nora Montgomery, who was reconstructed and brought back to life by Charles, after being kidnapped, killed, and dismembered. He is first seen in the "Pilot" episode, in which he kills the twins. He also takes part in Tate and Violet's basement attempt to scare Leah into ceasing her bullying of Violet by attacking her. In the "Birth" episode, a young Tate loses his toy in the basement's shadow and goes to retrieve it. Tate is grabbed by the Infantata, but is saved by Nora's ghost, who still refers to the monster as Thaddeus. The Infantata makes an appearance in the spin-off American Horror Stories, where he scares Maya and her friends in the basement. He appears later again in the seventh episode as a character of the videogame Escape from Murder House, attacking Connie in the basement.
 Abby (portrayed by Bianca Lawson) and Becca (portrayed by Christian Serratos) are Leah's best friends. They don't like how Leah is snobby towards new student Violet and tried to physically break up their fight in the lunch room so no one would get hurt.
 Stan (portrayed by David Anthony Higgins) is the tour guide who often shows up around the Murder House with various tourists explaining the house's history. He is one of the causes for the house to decline in price.
 Hugo Langdon (portrayed by Eric Close) was Constance's alcoholic, cheating husband, who was shot to death by Constance after she found him trying to force sex on their maid, Moira, (which she had previously agreed to) back in 1983. His body is ground up and fed to Constance's dogs. His ghost resides in the house, and is seen once having sexual relations with Hayden.
 Beauregard "Beau" Langdon (Sam Kinsey) is the son of Constance and Hugo Langdon and the brother of Tate, Adelaide, and Rose. He is afflicted with craniodiaphyseal dysplasia and seems to suffer a mental disability as well. He is very friendly in all of his encounters with other people, but despite this, he was kept chained in the attic by his mother when his family lived in the Murder House. He was smothered with a pillow by Larry Harvey (at Constance's request). However, Constance refused to admit this, instead saying he died of natural causes. His spirit is trapped within the house's attic. Constance was going to be charged with child neglect, meaning Beau would have been institutionalized by Child Protection Services, and she couldn't bear the thought of "them taking away" her family. It is unclear if she neglected one or all of her children. It was, however, 1994, the year in which Tate committed the Westfield High massacre. Later on, Constance visits Beau in the attic and tells him they will be separated because of Joe Escandarian's plans to tear the house down. He makes an appearance in Apocalypse attacking Madison. Also, Beau was reunited by Constance after she committed suicide. His rolling red ball appears in the first and seventh episodes of the spin-off American Horror Stories.
 Miguel Ramos (portrayed by Anthony Ruivivar), along with wife Stacy and son Gabe, moves into the house after the Harmons die, in the "Afterbirth" episode. While unpacking their belongings, Miguel and his wife discuss the idea of having another baby. This causes the Harmons, with the help of other ghosts, to scare the family away, so that they won't suffer the same fate they did. After only one night, the Ramoses move out of the house.
 Stacy Ramos (portrayed by Lisa Vidal) along with husband Miguel and son Gabe, moves into the house after the Harmons die, in the "Afterbirth" episode. While unpacking their belongings, Stacy and her husband talk about having another baby. This causes the Harmons, with the help of other ghosts, to scare the family away, so that they won't suffer the same fate they did. That night, Ben dresses himself as the Rubber Man, and pretends to attempt to rape Stacy, scaring her and her family away.
 Gabriel "Gabe" Ramos (portrayed by Brennan Mejia) is the son of Miguel and Stacy Ramos. He develops a connection with Violet's ghost after he finds her in his new bedroom looking through his music. Tate then tries to kill him so that Violet can have someone else to spend eternity with. Violet enters just in time to distract Tate, so that Gabe can escape. After one night, Gabe and his parents move out of the house.
 Jeffrey Harmon is the son of Vivien and Ben, the brother of Violet, and the fraternal twin half-brother of Michael. After being born, he took only one breath before dying, making him a spirit in the house. His ghost is taken by Nora Montgomery, who, after some time, decides she no longer wants to take care of him and gives him back to Vivien. Jeffrey is shown with the Harmons during Christmas time. Jeffrey was heard crying in Apocalypse.

References 

Murder House